The Chair of the Study of the Abrahamic Religions was created at the University of Oxford in 2008. The holder of the position is a member of the Faculty of Theology and Religion at the university and a Fellow of Lady Margaret Hall, Oxford. The role of the professor is to "[strengthen] Oxford's research and teaching in the Study of Religion, with particular reference to the three Abrahamic religions of Judaism, Christianity, and Islam."

List of Professors of the Study of the Abrahamic Religions

 2009–2013: Guy Stroumsa
 1 April 2015–present: Anna Abulafia

References

 
2008 establishments in England
Study of the Abrahamic Religions
Study of the Abrahamic Religions, *, Oxford
Lady Margaret Hall, Oxford
Lists of people associated with the University of Oxford